Avo or AVO may refer to:

Companies and organizations
 ÁVO, Hungarian secret police (1950–1956)
 Avo Photonics, optical electronics firm
 AVO Cigars, tobacco company founded by Avo Uvezian

People
 Avo (name), masculine given name found in Estonia

Science
 Alaska Volcano Observatory, a hazard monitoring program
 Amplitude versus offset, a concept used in reflection seismology
 Astrophysical Virtual Observatory, a European research project
 Avometer, a brand of multimeter that measures amps–volts–ohms

Other
 Agent–verb–object, a sentence structure in linguistics
 Apprehended Violence Order, an injunction in Australia
 Avon Park Executive Airport (IATA code), in Florida, U.S.
  of a Macanese pataca
  of a Portuguese Timorese pataca
 "AVO", a song on Amor Vincit Omnia by Pure Reason Revolution
 Avo, a character from Fable
 Avo, nom-de-guerre of Armenian-American revolutionary Monte Melkonian (1957–1993)

See also 
 Avos (disambiguation)

de:AVO